Smeaton Grange is an industrial suburb of Sydney, in the state of New South Wales, Australia. It is located in the Camden Council local government area. The suburb mainly consists of industrial buildings and warehouses.

History
The area now known as Smeaton Grange was originally home to the Muringong, southernmost of the Darug people. In 1805 John Macarthur established his property at Camden where he raised merino sheep.

Education
There is one local school, Magdalene Catholic High School (MCHS), which was built in 2000 and is located on Smeaton Grange Road.

Governance 
Smeaton Grange is part of the north ward of Camden Council represented by Lara Symkowiak (currently mayor), David Bligh and Peter Sidgreaves. The suburb is contained within the federal electorate of Macarthur, represented by Russell Matheson (Liberal), and the state electorate of Camden, currently held by Chris Patterson (Liberal).

References

External links
  [CC-By-SA]

Suburbs of Sydney
Camden Council (New South Wales)